Centerville is an unincorporated community in Evangeline Parish, Louisiana, United States.

Notes

Unincorporated communities in Evangeline Parish, Louisiana
Unincorporated communities in Louisiana